Liceo Comercial Femenino Concepción (Commercial High School for Girls) is an educational institution, located in Concepción, Chile.

General
Within it is the Liceo Comercial Female (INCOFE), which is oriented 12345 to the sector of Administration and Commerce, giving the following fields: Administration, Accounting and Secretarial.

Staff
(Directory Teaching INCOFE)
 General Manager of the Corporation study, Training, Employment chamber production and trade of Conception: Andreina Borzone Tassara
 Academic Director: Sherry Silvia Sepulveda
 Inspector General: Violet Bennett Olavarria
 Head, Race: Lacoste Maria Puga
 Chief Administrative Officer: Luis Figueroa Retamal

References

External links
Corporación de Estudio
Informativos por liceos

Schools in Biobío Region